Princess Suwarin (German: Die Prinzessin Suwarin) is a 1923 German silent film directed by Johannes Guter and starring Lil Dagover, Heinrich Schroth and Xenia Desni.

The film's sets were designed by the art director Erich Czerwonski.

Cast
 Lil Dagover as Tina Bermonte  
 Heinrich Schroth 
 Xenia Desni as Princess Suvarin  
 Alfred Abel as Kipman  
 Hans Scholl
 Rudolf Klein-Rogge as Cyrus Proctor  
 Lucie Mannheim as Esterka Kipman 
 Anton Edthofer as Mniewski  
 Heinrich Gotho 
 Guido Herzfeld 
 Ernst Pröckl 
 Yuri Yurovsky

References

Bibliography
 Hardt, Ursula. From Caligari to California: Erich Pommer's Life in the International Film Wars. Berghahn Books, 1996.

External links

1923 films
Films of the Weimar Republic
Films directed by Johannes Guter
German silent feature films
Films with screenplays by Thea von Harbou
UFA GmbH films
Films produced by Erich Pommer
German black-and-white films